Guillermo Subiabre Astorga (25 February 1903 – 11 April 1964) was a Chilean footballer. During his career he played for Colo-Colo (1927–1934), Santiago Wanderers, and the Chile national football team. He also participated in the 1928 Summer Olympics and in the 1930 FIFA World Cup.

At Colo-Colo, Subiabre played as a striker for eight seasons, six of which were part of the amateur period and two of which were part of the professional period. In 1934, he was recognized as a lifetime honorary player for Colo-Colo.

International goals
Chile's goal tally first

References

External links
 FIFA.com - FIFA Player Statistics: Guillermo Subiabre

1903 births
1964 deaths
Chilean footballers
Chile international footballers
Chilean people of Basque descent
Santiago Wanderers footballers
Colo-Colo footballers
Olympic footballers of Chile
Footballers at the 1928 Summer Olympics
1930 FIFA World Cup players
People from Osorno, Chile
Association football forwards